The Handball Championship of Bosnia and Herzegovina is the top handball league in Bosnia and Herzegovina. The league is operated by the Handball Federation of Bosnia and Herzegovina. It is composed of 16 teams. The champion is seeded into the EHF Champions League. Second team is seeded into EHF Cup, while third and fourth teams go to EHF Challenge Cup. The winner of the league cup is seeded into the EHF Cup Winner's Cup.

Premier handball league for men

2021-22 Season participants 

The following 16 clubs compete in the Handball Premier League during the 2021-22 season.

EHF coefficients

Country ranking
EHF League Ranking for 2018/19 season:

30.  (28)  Meistriliiga (6.83)
31.  (29)  Superliga (5.50)
32.  (32)  Premier league (5.25)
33.  (33)  Serie A (4.00)
34.  (34)  GHR A (3.33)

Club ranking
EHF Club Ranking as of 12 April 2021:

 78.   (86)  Borac (85)
 149.  (125) Vogošća Poljine Hills (34)
 156.  (250) RK Gračanica (31)
 186.  (232) Sloga Doboj (21)
 240.  (303) Bosna Visoko (13)

List of champions
United Premier league exists from 2001. Till that year, in Bosnia there were three separated federations and championships. EHF recognized only that of official Handball Federation of Bosnia and Herzegovina based in Sarajevo.

In years 1998 and 1999 playoffs were held, with teams competing from Federation based in Sarajevo, and Handball Federation of Herzeg-Bosnia. In 2001 clubs from Republika Srpska and their Federation participated, and for the first time after Bosnian War, clubs from all of Bosnia and Herzegovina were competing with each other. Sadly, next year, in 2001 clubs from Republika Srpska refused to play, and therefore playoffs were not played. Only in 2002 was this drama of Bosnian handball ended. In 2001 united Premier league of Bosnia and Herzegovina started, which was a turning point for better quality of teams in years to come.

Note: Till united league, only Handball Federation of B&H was officially recognized by European Handball Federation, and also International Handball Federation. Bolded teams were declared as official winners of Premier league of Bosnia and Herzegovina.

Champions of united Premier league of Bosnia and Herzegovina which started from 2001.

2001–2002 HRK Izviđač
2002–2003 RK Bosna Sarajevo
2003–2004 HRK Izviđač
2004–2005 HRK Izviđač
2005–2006 RK Bosna Sarajevo
2006–2007 RK Bosna Sarajevo
2007–2008 RK Bosna Lido osiguranje
2008–2009 RK Bosna Sunce osiguranje
2009–2010 RK Bosna BH Gas
2010–2011 RK Bosna BH Gas
2011–2012 RK Sloga Mobis
2012–2013 RK Borac m:tel
2013–2014 RK Borac m:tel
2014–2015 RK Borac m:tel
2015–2016 HRK Izviđač
2016–2017 RK Borac m:tel
2017–2018 HRK Izviđač
2018–2019 HRK Izviđač
2019–2020 RK Borac m:tel
2020-2021 HRK Izviđač
2021–2022 RK Borac m:tel

Performance by club

Including titles in SFR Yugoslavia championship

Premier handball league for women

2021-22 Season participants 
The following 12 clubs compete in the Handball Premier League during the 2021-22 season.

EHF coefficients

Country ranking
EHF League Ranking for 2020/21 season:

24.  (24)  Premier League (3.33)
25.  (25)  Super League (1.17)
26.  (26)  Premier League (1.00)
26.  (26)  A1 (1.00)
26.  (26)  Ligat Ha'Al (1.00)

Club ranking
EHF Club Ranking as of 12 April 2021:

 108.  (153) HŽRK Grude (41)
 158.  (147) ŽRK Krivaja (19)
 187.  (180) ŽRK Hadžići (11)
 227.  (211) HŽRK Zrinjski Mostar (7)
 242.  (236) ŽRK Ilidža (5)

List of champions 

Note: Till united league, only Handball Federation of B&H was officially recognized by European Handball Federation, and also International Handball Federation. Bolded teams were declared as official winners of Premier league of Bosnia and Herzegovina.

Note: Interinvest Mostar merged with HŽRK Zrinjski Mostar

Champions of the united Premier league of Bosnia and Herzegovina which started from 2001.

2001–2002 Zrinjski
2002–2003 Ljubuški HO, Ljubuški
2003–2004 Galeb, Mostar
2004–2005 Zrinjski
2005–2006 Zrinjski
2006–2007 Borac
2007–2008 Borac
2008–2009 Borac
2009–2010 Borac
2010–2011 Borac
2011–2012 Borac
2012–2013 Zrinjski
2013–2014 Mira
2014–2015 Grude
2015–2016 Grude
2016–2017 Grude
2017–2018 Grude
2018–2019 Grude
2019–2020 Grude
2020-2021 Borac
2021–2022 Grude

Performance by club

See also
Handball Cup of Bosnia and Herzegovina

References

 
Handball leagues in Bosnia and Herzegovina